In June 2013, France played a three-test series against New Zealand as part of the 2013 mid-year rugby test series. This was the sides' first encounter since they met in the 2011 Rugby World Cup Final, which New Zealand won 8–7. It was France's first test series against the All Blacks since their 2009 two-test tour of New Zealand, which ended in a 1–1 draw.

The tour began at the stadium where they last played each other, Eden Park in Auckland on 8 June. Following this, they played a mid-week match against the Auckland Super Rugby franchise, the Blues, at North Harbour Stadium in Auckland on 11 June. The second test was played in Christchurch at Rugby League Park on 15 June, and the third test at Yarrow Stadium in New Plymouth on 22 June.

Fixtures

Squads

France
On 14 May, head coach Philippe Saint-André named a 35-man squad for the fixtures against New Zealand and the Blues. The selection created controversy when South African-born prop Daniel Kötze and flank Bernard Le Roux and Fijian-born wing Noa Nakaitaci (qualifying on residency grounds) were chosen ahead of in-form French-born players. The most notable absentees were wing Vincent Clerc (injured with his club), captain and lock Pascal Papé (injured during the Six Nations Championship) and fly-half François Trinh-Duc (deemed out of form, with Camille Lopez and Rémi Talès chosen ahead of him).

Wing Alexis Palisson withdrew from the squad due to injury and was replaced with Marc Andreu prior to the first test. Injured during the first test, flank Fulgence Ouedraogo also withdrew from the tour and was replaced in the squad by Damien Chouly.

Head coach: Philippe Saint-André

 Caps and ages are to first Test (8 June 2013)

Note*: Chouly joined the squad between the first two tests after Ouedraogo came off injured in the first test.

New Zealand
New Zealand 32-man squad for the 2013 mid-year series to be played against France. The squad includes Matt Todd, who is included as injury cover for Sam Whitelock—who is not expected to be available until the third Test. All players play Super Rugby and provincial rugby within New Zealand.

Prop Joe Moody was added to the squad as prop cover should all the original props not be available for the first test.

 Head coach:  Steve Hansen
 Caps and ages are to first Test (8 June 2013)

Background
Following their later encounter in the 2011 Rugby World Cup Final France and New Zealand had different fortunes.

France, under the leadership of newly appointed head coach Philippe Saint-André, endured a mixed 2012 Six Nations Championship (ending 4th with 2 wins, 1 draw and 2 losses) which was the last outing of several key figures of the squad with the likes of Julien Bonnaire, Imanol Harinordoquy, Lionel Nallet, Jean-Baptiste Poux, Aurélien Rougerie, William Servat and Dimitri Yachvili playing their last games in the France jersey while only a couple of players (Wesley Fofana and Yoann Maestri) received their first caps. The Summer tour of Argentina then marked the rise of new players like Brice Dulin, Maxime Machenaud, Fofana and Maestri and saw the return in the mix of Thomas Domingo (who had missed on the World Cup due to injury), Yoann Huget (who had missed on the World Cup due to suspension) and Frédéric Michalak (back from his stint in Super Rugby after having fallen out of favour of French rugby) while experienced players like Vincent Clerc and Thierry Dusautoir were rested, the captaincy being handed to Pascal Papé. The Series was drawn 1-1. France then ended 2012 on a high with three straight wins in the Autumn Internationals over Australia, Argentina and Samoa, claiming the fourth spot in the IRB World Rankings which gave them First Seed status for the 2015 Rugby World Cup draw thus avoiding New Zealand, Australia and South Africa at pool stage. However the 2013 Six Nations Championship was a real disappointment as France ended up bottom of the table, claiming only one win and a draw with a squad that had not much evolved since the previous Summer - Antonie Claassen, Gaël Fickou, Jocelino Suta and Sébastien Vahaamahina being the only new caps while long-time absentees Mathieu Bastareaud and Yannick Nyanga were recalled. Philippe Saint-André stated that the Top 14 final being played just one week prior to the first test, players taking part in this final and thus joining the squad late would not feature in the first test.

New Zealand also started 2012 with a new head coach with former assistant coach Steve Hansen taking over Graham Henry's role. The All Blacks whitewashed Ireland during their Summer tour, winning the series 3-0 with a remarkable 60-0 victory in the third Test, their largest ever winning margin over Ireland. New Zealand followed with a perfect 2012 Rugby Championship - which featured Argentina for the first time - winning all six of their games. However their traditional Bledisloe Cup match in October put an end to their 16-game winning streak when they drew (18-18) with Australia. The All Blacks went on to hammer Scotland, Italy and Wales (scoring 30+ points each time) in the end-of-year tests before suffering their first defeat in two years at the hands of England on December 1. New Zealand however remained on top of the IRB World Rankings and were given Top Seed status for the 2015 Rugby World Cup. Starting in January 2013, stalwart All Blacks captain Richie McCaw was granted a six-month sabbatical from rugby to try and extend his career up to the 2015 World Cup. He has thus not taken any part in the 2013 Super Rugby campaign nor will he take part in the mid-year tests series against France. He is due to resume his international career in the 2013 Rugby Championship after a few stints with his Christchurch club side.

Matches

 Ben Afeaki earned his first full international cap for New Zealand
 Alexandre Flanquart, Daniel Kötze, Camille Lopez and Adrien Planté earned their first full international caps for France.

 Eddy Ben Arous, Bernard Le Roux, Noa Nakaitaci and Rémi Talès made their first senior appearance for France. However, as the match was not granted Test status, they remained uncapped.
 Having represented New Zealand on 24 occasions, Anthony Boric was the only full international among the Blues team.

Notes:
 Captaining the All Blacks for the third time, Kieran Read earned his 50th cap in this match.
 New Zealand's 30-0 win was the first time France has failed to score points against the All Blacks.
 Bernard Le Roux and Rémi Tales earned their first full international caps for France in this match.
 Jeremy Thrush earned his first full international cap for New Zealand in this match.
 Having won the first two Tests, the All Blacks had already won the Series at this stage.

Notes:
 Eddy Ben Arous earned his first full international cap for France in this match.
 Steve Luatua, Charles Piutau and Matt Todd earned their first full international caps for New Zealand in this match.
 Joe Moody and Francis Saili of New Zealand and Noa Nakaitaci of France failed to appear in any of the Tests thus remaining uncapped at the end of the tour.
 Having won the third Test, the All Blacks completed the tour clean sweep.

Aftermath
Following the tour the All Blacks went on to record a perfect 2013 Rugby Championship against Argentina, Australia and South Africa with six wins out of six matches for the second time in a row in as many instances of the competition.

During the end-of-year internationals they went on to beat successively Australia, Japan, France, England and Ireland thus finishing 2013 undefeated with 14 wins out of 14 matches, the first national team to ever achieve this feat in the professional era.

After suffering their fourth defeat at the hands of New Zealand in the same year in their first match of the end-of-year internationals, France overcame Tonga before losing to South Africa thus finishing the year with only two wins out of eleven matches.

France then experienced a mixed 2014 Six Nations Championship with three wins (against England and Italy at home and Scotland away) and two losses (to Wales away and Ireland at home), ending up fourth.

During the 2014 mid-year internationals New Zealand hosted England while France toured Australia.

See also
 History of rugby union matches between France and New Zealand
 2013 mid-year rugby test series

References

2013
France national rugby union team tours
Rugby union tours of New Zealand